Zelda Fay D'Aprano  (24 January 1928 – 21 February 2018) was a feminist activist living in Melbourne, Victoria.

Life

Early life 
D'Aprano (born Zelda Fay Orloff) grew up in a two-bedroom house in Carlton with her brother Maurice, her sister Clara and her parents Shimshon and Rachel Leah Orloff. She grew up in an Orthodox Jewish household, but her mother became a communist when D'Aprano was still a child, prompting D'Aprano to become one herself in later years. She left school before she was 14 to work in various factories, despite being placed in a gifted class at school. She was married at 16 to Charlie D'Aprano, who left her 21 years later, and she had a child when she was 17, a daughter named Leonie. It was at these factory jobs when she first started to notice the inequalities that female workers faced, especially related to the pay gap. She was fired from several jobs for trying to better the conditions in which women worked. She joined the Communist Party in 1950 and was a member until 1971.

Schooling 
D'Aprano left school before her fourteenth birthday to support her family. She later fully qualified as a dental nurse in 1961. She completed her Leaving Certificate in 1965, at the same time as her daughter. She attended night school for two years graduating in 1967 as a qualified chiropodist, though she never practised.

Occupation 
After various jobs, including at a shortbread factory and a grocer's, D'Aprano went to work at Larundel Psychiatric Hospital as a dental nurse. She joined the Hospital Employees' Federation No.2 Branch, in which there was little support for her, especially as she was a woman. She was made shop steward while there, putting her in charge of all the women who worked as dental nurses. She also worked two days a week at a disabled children's hospital, the other three days spent at the psychiatric hospital. In 1969, she joined the Australasian Meat Industry Employees' Union (AMIEU), working as a clerk there. She was appalled by the conditions in the office, and even more so when she discovered that there was no one to talk to about them. She attempted to be active in both the AMIEU and at work in trying to correct the work situations that women faced, but was constantly rebuffed and her efforts overlooked. After being fired from the AMIEU for criticising her boss, she joined the Mail Exchange as a mail sorter.

Activism 
It was in 1969, when D'Aprano was working in the AMIEU, that the union was being used as a test case for the Equal Pay Case. D'Aprano and several other women waited as the case was being decided in the Arbitration Court. On 21 October 1969, after the case failed, she chained herself to the doors of the Commonwealth Building during her lunch break, with women who worked in the building supporting her. She was eventually cut free by police. Ten days later, on 31 October, she was joined by Alva Geikie and Thelma Solomon, and they chained themselves to the doors of the Arbitration Court, the one which had dismissed the Equal Pay Case. There was media coverage for both, although little footage. For this activism she was dismissed from the AMIEU.

The next year, these three women founded the Women's Action Committee to jump start the Women's Liberation Movement in Melbourne. This organisation tried to get women more involved in activism as "we had passed the stage of caring about a "lady-like" image because women had for too long been polite and ladylike and were still being ignored" (D'Aprano 1995). This led the women to take more militant action on their path to equal pay. These same women founded the Women's Liberation Centre on Little Latrobe Street in 1972.

She kept her left-wing values, though she left the Communist Party in 1971, and recognised that the socialist movement was often just as unaccepting of women as everyone else.

The Women's Action Committee kept going, and grew as it went. They travelled around Melbourne paying only 75% of the fares, because women were only given 75% of the wage of men at the time. Because women weren't allowed to drink in bars, only in lounges, they did pub crawls across Melbourne. The Committee helped arrange the first pro-choice rally in around 1975. Even though it was an incredibly secret subject at the time, 500 women attended the march, though with very little media coverage.

D'Aprano was awarded a degree in Law honoris causa by Macquarie University in 2000, and was inducted into the Victorian Honour Roll of Women in 2001. She was awarded the Order of Australia in 2004

Bibliography

Books
 Zelda: The Becoming of a Woman, Z. D'Aprano, North Carlton, Victoria, 1977, 
 Zelda, new edition, Spinifex Press, North Melbourne, 1995, 
 Kath Williams: The unions and the fight for equal pay, Spinifex Press, North Melbourne, 2001,

Contributions
 "What Do You Do When You Are Fed up with Men's Mismanagement of Our Planet Earth and Their Wars?", in September 11, 2001 : Feminist perspectives, edited by Susan Hawthorne and Bronwyn Winter, Spinifex Press, North Melbourne, 2002, 
 ''Women's Web stories actions Women's Web

References 

1928 births
2018 deaths
Australian feminists
Officers of the Order of Australia
20th-century Australian women
21st-century Australian women
21st-century Australian people
People from Melbourne